Double Dose is the fourth and final studio album by American rapper Tela. It was released on October 8, 2002 through Rap-A-Lot Resurrection. Recording sessions took place at House Of Blues Studios and Out Da Woods Studios in Memphis and at Dean's List House Of Hits in Houston. Production was handled by Tela himself, along with DJ Slice T, Drumma Boy, Insane Wayne, Paragon, DJ Jus Borne and Jazze Pha. It features guest appearances from Bun B, Jazze Pha, Low Key, Criminal Manne, Devin the Dude, 8Ball & MJG, Gangsta Boo, Haystak, Maru, Papa Reu, Streetboy, The Game, Yo Gotti and Geno. The album peaked at number 116 on the Billboard 200 and number 18 on the Top R&B/Hip-Hop Albums.

Track listing

Personnel

Winston "Tela" Rogers – main artist, producer (tracks: 1, 4-6, 9, 11-16)
Marcus McRee – additional vocals (tracks: 1, 15, 16)
Eric Gales – guitar (tracks: 1, 12)
Bernard "Bun B" Freeman – featured artist (tracks: 2, 13)
Geno – chorus (tracks: 3, 4, 10), additional vocals (track 14)
Lola "Gangsta Boo" Mitchell – featured artist (track 5)
Mario "Yo Gotti" Mims – featured artist (track 5)
Jason "Haystak" Winfree – featured artist (track 5)
Criminal Manne of Project Playaz – featured artist (track 5)
Maru – featured artist (track 5)
Christopher "Drumma Boy" Gholson – additional vocals (track 5), producer (tracks: 5, 9, 14)
Candice – additional vocals (track 6)
Choosey – additional vocals (track 6)
Premro "8Ball" Smith – featured artist (track 7)
Marlon "MJG" Goodwin – featured artist (track 7)
Phalon "Jazze Pha" Alexander – featured artist (tracks: 7, 11), producer (track 7)
Devin "Devin the Dude" Copeland – featured artist (track 8)
Streetboy – featured artist (track 9)
Thomas "Low Key" McCollum – featured artist (tracks: 9, 10)
Reuben "Papa Reu" Nero – featured artist (track 9)
Jewel Santez – additional vocals (track 12)
Jayceon "The Game" Taylor – featured artist (track 13)
Poizon – additional vocals (track 15)
Sheldon "Slice T" Arrington – producer (tracks: 1-3, 8, 10, 15, 16), engineering, mixing
James "DJ Jus Borne" Blake – producer (track 4), engineering, mixing
Mike Dean – co-producer (tracks: 4, 13, 14), mixing, mastering
Ferrell "Ensayne Wayne" Miles – producer (tracks: 6, 11)
Stephen "Paragon" Carroll – producer (tracks: 12, 13)
Jeff Wilbanks – engineering
Lil' Pat – engineering
James "J Prince" Smith – executive producer
Jason Clark – design, layout
Rick Mapes – photography
Anzel "Int'l Red" Jennings – A&R
Tony "Big Chief" Randle – A&R

Charts

References

2002 albums
Tela (rapper) albums
Rap-A-Lot Records albums
Albums produced by Jazze Pha
Albums produced by Drumma Boy